Irma Gramatica (pseudonym of Maria Francesca Gramatica; 25 November 1870 – 24 October 1962) was an Italian stage and film actress. Gramatica appeared in ten films during her career including The Materassi Sisters (1944). Her sisters Anna Capodaglio and Emma Gramatica were both actresses.

Selected filmography
 Port (1934)
 The Former Mattia Pascal (1937)
 Yes, Madam (1942)
 The Materassi Sisters (1944)
 Unknown Men of San Marino (1946)
 Tragic Spell (1951)

References

Bibliography 
 Landy, Marcia. The Folklore of Consensus: Theatricality in the Italian Cinema, 1930-1943. SUNY Press, 1998.

External links 

 

1870 births
1962 deaths
Italian film actresses
Actors from Rijeka
20th-century Italian actresses